Michael 'Doc' Thompson (May 6, 1969 – February 5, 2019) was an American political commentator and radio personality.

Career
Thompson was a conservative-libertarian who hosted The Doc Thompson Show on numerous talk radio stations around the United States, including WRVA in Richmond, Virginia from 2007 to 2012 and WLW in Cincinnati, Ohio from 2010 to 2012. He hosted The Morning Blaze with Doc Thompson on TheBlaze Radio Network beginning in 2013, and commuted to TheBlaze's headquarters in Dallas, Texas from his home in Bentonville, Arkansas to host the show. He left TheBlaze in 2018 to start Mojo 5.0, a libertarian-focused online radio network, where he hosted "Doc Thompson's Daily Mojo".

Personal life and death
Thompson was married to Yuna Lee, a television anchor who has worked for WHIO-TV in Dayton, Ohio and KHBS in Fort Smith, Arkansas. He had three children.

On February 5, 2019, Thompson was killed after being struck by an Amtrak train while jogging near train tracks in Haltom City, Texas.

References

1969 births
2019 deaths
American broadcast news analysts
American political commentators
American social commentators
Railway accident deaths in the United States
American conservative talk radio hosts
People from Ohio
People from Bentonville, Arkansas
Radio personalities from Ohio